The 1994 AFL draft consisted of a pre-season draft, a national draft, a trade period and a rookie elevation. The AFL draft is the annual draft of talented players by Australian rules football teams that participate in the main competition of that sport, the Australian Football League.

In 1994 there were 97 picks to be drafted between 15 teams in the national draft. The Fremantle Dockers were given the first pick as they were to compete for the first time in the 1995 AFL season.

1994 pre-draft selections

1994 national draft

1995 pre-season draft

1995 uncontracted and concession player selections
As part of Fremantle Football Club's impending entry to the AFL in the 1995 AFL season, clubs that lost uncontracted players to the new side were allocated a 16-year-old concession selection to compensate them for their loss.  These players were otherwise not eligible to be drafted until the following draft.  Fremantle and Essendon Football Club arranged a deal where they would not recruit any uncontracted players from clubs below Essendon on the ladder, to allow Essendon the chance to have the first selection in the concession selections, which they used to recruit their future captain and leading goalscorer, Matthew Lloyd.

References

AFL Draft
Australian Football League draft